Holmer Green Football Club are an F.A. Charter Standard football club based at Holmer Green near High Wycombe in Buckinghamshire, England. The club is affiliated to the Berks & Bucks Football Association. They were established in 1908 and were founder members of the Chiltonian League in 1984. They are currently managed by Keith Scott.

History 

Holmer Green F.C. was founded in 1908 and started playing in the Chesham & District League. In 1934 the club switched to the Wycombe Combination League, as it was known then. In 1953 the club won its first major trophy – the Berks & Bucks Junior Cup. The 1960s saw success again in the Berks & Bucks Junior Cup (1965) as well as three further victories in the Chesham Charity Cup.

Under Norman King's managership, the Wycombe League title was won in 1972 and 1974. In 1975 the club moved its headquarters to the new H.G.S.A. complex at Watchet Lane. This move coincided with victory in the Wycombe Senior Cup, and in 1977 with Roly Clarke as manager the team won the Berks & Bucks Intermediate Cup. This victory gained the club senior status and in 1981, with Pete Eyres as manager the Wycombe League and League Cup was won.

In 1984, Holmer Green were founder members of the new Chiltonian League, winning the Premier Division in 1984–85 and 1985–86. In 1991 with new manager Barry Hedley, they finished third in the league, won the Wycombe Senior Cup and also reached the semi-finals of the Berks & Bucks Intermediate Cup.

At the beginning of the 1993–94 season, Barry Hedley returned north, and Ian Sheill took over as manager and assisted by Jez Hodges led the team to the Premier Division title. The Centenary Wycombe Senior Cup was also won for the second time in three years. The 1994–95 season, the club's last in the Chiltonian League, saw even more trophies in the cabinet: the team finished as runners-up in the league but finally managed to win the Bon Accord Trophy for the first time.

At the end of the 1994–95 season, the club tried to move up to the next league of the English football league system into the South Midlands League. They were denied permission to move by the Chiltonian League, so the club spent the summer of 1995 in various FA tribunals and appeals, eventually winning their case in mid-August 1995, and being accepted into the Senior Division of the South Midlands League. In this season they won the Senior Division title and also reached the semi-finals of the Berks & Bucks Senior Trophy.

In the 1996–97 season, Jez Hodges was installed as player-manager, and the club won the Senior Division Cup and claimed the runners-up spot in the league. This season also saw them play their very first FA Vase game, away to Carterton Town. They retained the Senior Division Cup in the following season and finished in fourth place in the league.

With the merger of the Spartan and South Midlands Leagues in 1997–98, Holmer Green were placed in the Senior Division of the new Spartan South Midlands League, which they won on goal difference over Hanwell Town, getting promoted to the Premier Division. They also reached the final of the Berks & Bucks Senior Trophy for the first time, losing 1–0 to Eton Wick, and also reached the two-legged final of the League Challenge Trophy, losing 3–0 on aggregate to Waltham Abbey. Promotion to the Premier Division was achieved as the club had floodlights installed that season to enable them to play at that standard. In the 2000–01 season the club played its first ever FA Cup game, losing 6–1 against Uxbridge.

In 2008, Holmer Green commemorated their centenary year with a friendly at Watchet Lane against Wycombe Wanderers in front of a record crowd in excess of 800 people.

The following year, however, the club was relegated back to the first division, but in the 2009–10 bounced back as champions of the Spartan South Midlands League Division One and until 2017–18 season were still in the Premier Division. However, at the close of the season and as part of a reorganisation managed by the FA, they were moved sideways into the UHL Hellenic League. Manager Chris Allen retired from the club after ten years in May 2019 and was replaced by Dave Lynch for the start of the 2019/20 season after Holmer Green were moved into The Hellenic Premier Division. Dave Lynch was replaced by Matt Stowell in September 2019. These last two seasons were curtailed by the Covid pandemic and for the start of the 2021/22 season the club were moved back to The Spartan South Midlands League. Matt Stowell was replaced in December 2021 by Tom Bryant. Holmer Green ended the 2021/22 season bottom of the SSML Premier Division and will compete in SSML Division One for the 2022/23 season. In August 2022 Tom Bryant was replaced by ex-Youth Team Head Coach, Ian Lancaster and ex-Development Team Head Coach, Jez Hodges, both in joint Head Coach roles. 
In November 2022 Paul Batchelor was appointed First Team Head Coach.

Ground 
Holmer Green play their home games at Watchet Lane, Holmer Green, Buckinghamshire, HP15 6UF.

The club has been playing at Watchet Lane since 1975, moving from their old ground at The Common.

In 1995, a covered stand was built in late September and in the same year Football League club, Wycombe Wanderers, decided to use Holmer Green as their training headquarters. In addition, the England Youth Team, the England ladies Team and several International Under 21 sides have all used Holmer Green as their base when in the area.

In 1997, floodlights were installed at the ground enabling the club to meet the required standards to be promoted to the Spartan South Midlands Premier Division from League one.

Their Watchet Lane ground was featured in David Bauckham's book Dugouts, which highlighted a large sign painted on the rear of the dugouts saying, "Please do not swear".

Honours 
Spartan South Midlands League Senior Division
Winners: 1998–99
Spartan South Midlands League Division One
Winners: 2009–10
South Midlands League Senior Division
Winners: 1995–96
Runners-up: 1996–97
Chiltonian League Premier Division
Winners: 1984–85, 1985–86, 1993–94
Runners-up: 1994–95
Wycombe League
Winners: 1971–72, 1973–74, 1976–77, 1980–81
Runners-up: 1972–73, 1975–76, 1977–78
Berks & Bucks Senior Trophy
Runners-up: 1998–99
South Midlands League Senior Division Cup
Winners: 1996–97, 1997–98
Spartan South Midlands League Challenge Trophy
Runners-up: 1998–99
Berks & Bucks Intermediate Cup
Winners: 1976–77
Berks & Bucks Junior Cup
Winners: 1952–53, 1964–65
Wycombe League Cup
Winners: 1980–81
Runners-up: 1982–83

Records 
Highest League Position: 6th in Spartan South Midlands League Premier Division: 2000–01
FA CUP Best Performance First Qualifying Round: 2004–05
FA Vase Best Performance Second Round: 2016–17
Highest Attendance 800 Vs Wycombe Wanderers 2008 (Friendly)

References

External links 
Website

Spartan South Midlands Football League
Chiltonian League
Football clubs in Buckinghamshire
Association football clubs established in 1908
1908 establishments in England
Football clubs in England
Hellenic Football League